Aap Se Mausiiquii is the second album by Himesh Reshammiya, with lyrics by Manoj Muntashir. While the title track and "Menu Kehn De" were released in November and the whole album was released on 5 December 2016, by T-Series, Amitabh Bachchan and HR Musik Limited.

Track listing
All songs were composed by Himesh Reshammiya with lyrics written by Manoj Muntashir

Original

Remixes

Music videos 
 "Aap Se Mausiquii" - The first video song of this album was the title track. There is also a trailer of this track. The  music video features Reshammiya himself and Puja Bose as a blind pianist girl who is the love interest of Reshammiya.
 "Menu Kehn De" - The video depicts the ups and downs of a love relationship. The video features Reshammiya and model Alankrita Sahai. The song is most viewed song of this album.
 "Every Night and Day" - The song marked the debut of Romanian singer and actor Iulia Vantur. There was a making video also released.
 "Tonight" - This video song features Reshammiya, Alankrita Sahai and model Don Pablo. The song has 3.1 million views.
 "So Much in Love" - The rock song depicts Reshammiya and Alankrita Sahai as his girlfriend.
 "Trippy" - The song features Fan (film) actress Waluscha De Sousa and Reshammiya and Neha Kakkar also featured as singer.

Critical reception
Joginder Tuteja of MovieTalkies.com gave the album 4.5 out of 5.

References

2016 albums
Himesh Reshammiya albums
Himesh Reshammiya